Vessel States is the second studio album by Baltimore band Wilderness. It was recorded, mixed and mastered in the fall of 2005, by Chad Clark and T.J. Lipple at Silver Sonya in Arlington, Virginia.

Track listing
 "The Blood Is on the Wall"
 "Beautiful Alarms"
 "Emergency"
 "Last"
 "Fever Pitch"
 "Death Verses"
 "Towered"
 "Gravity Bent Light"
 "Monumental"

References

2006 albums
Wilderness (band) albums
Jagjaguwar albums